Harichovce is a village and municipality in the Spišská Nová Ves District in the Košice Region of central-eastern Slovakia.

History
In historical records the village was first mentioned in 1268.

Geography
The village lies at an altitude of 446 metres and covers an area of 10.8 km².
It has a population of about 1725 people.

Genealogical resources

The records for genealogical research are available at the state archive "Statny Archiv in Levoca, Slovakia"

 Roman Catholic church records (births/marriages/deaths): 1789-1897 (parish A)
 Lutheran church records (births/marriages/deaths): 1783-1896 (parish B)

See also
 List of municipalities and towns in Slovakia

External links
http://en.e-obce.sk/obec/harichovce/harichovce.html
http://www.harichovce.ocu.sk
http://www.statistics.sk/mosmis/eng/run.html 
Surnames of living people in Harichovce

Villages and municipalities in Spišská Nová Ves District